Hingalol District is a district in the eastern Sanaag region of Somaliland.

See also
Administrative divisions of Somaliland
Regions of Somaliland
Districts of Somaliland

References

Districts of Somaliland
Sanaag